The Air Sports AIRector 120 is a German ultralight aircraft, designed and produced by Air Sports Aircrafts  of Dassel. It was introduced at the Aero show held in Friedrichshafen in 2010.

Design and development
The aircraft was designed to comply with the Fédération Aéronautique Internationale microlight rules. It features a cantilever low-wing, a single-seat, enclosed cockpit, fixed conventional landing gear and a single engine in tractor configuration.

The initial standard engine is the  Hirth F23 two-stroke powerplant, but it is expected that an all-electric drive train will be available soon.

Variants
AIRector 120
Original model
AIRector 300
Model introduced in 2015 with retractable landing gear and a  engine.

Specifications (AIRector 120)

References

External links

2010s German ultralight aircraft
Light-sport aircraft
Single-engined tractor aircraft
Electric aircraft